Caladenia osmera is a plant in the orchid family Orchidaceae and is endemic to south-eastern Australia. It is a ground orchid with a single leaf and one or two greenish-cream flowers with pink stripes and which has a sharp odour resembling burnt plastic.

Description
The flowers have a sharp odour resembling the smell of burnt plastic. The sepals and petals spread widely and horizontally or curve downwards. Flowering occurs in September and October.

Taxonomy and naming
This orchid was first formally described in 2006 by David Jones and given the name Arachnorchis osmera. The description was published in Australian Orchid Research. In 2007 Gary Backhouse changed the name to Caladenia osmera. The specific epithet (osmera) is derived from the Ancient Greek word osme meaning "smell" or "odour" referring to the strong floral scent of this species.

Distribution and habitat
Caladenia osmera is only known from areas east of Bruthen where it grows in tall montane forest. It probably also occurs on the Southern Tablelands of New South Wales.

Conservation
Caladenia osmera  is listed as  "vulnerable" under the Victorian Flora and Fauna Guarantee Act 1988.

References

osmera
Plants described in 2006
Endemic orchids of Australia
Orchids of Victoria (Australia)
Taxa named by David L. Jones (botanist)